The Atari XG-1 light gun is a video game controller which was released in 1987. As Atari's only light gun, it is unique to the 8-bit family. It is compatible with the Atari XEGS, and with the 7800 and 2600 home video game consoles. Atari eventually released five light gun games on the 7800 (Alien Brigade, Barnyard Blaster, Crossbow, Meltdown, and Sentinel) and one on the 2600 (Sentinel).

Hardware
The XG-1 is a specialized light pen. Generic light pen support was built into the Atari 8-bit home computer family since its 1979 launch. The Atari 400/800 Hardware Technical Reference recommends a calibration procedure each time a light pen is used, so that the software can compensate for this offset for maximal accuracy. Bug Hunt and Barnyard Blaster for the XEGS each have unique hard-coded values. A reddish-orange version of the gun was planned for the 2600 and 7800 but was never released.

Games
Sentinel is the only game released for the gun on the 2600 console, and Shooting Arcade was planned but never released.

Reception
For Antic magazine in August 1988, Matthew Ratcliff criticized the poor horizontal accuracy of the XG-1 light gun compared to the NES Zapper or the Sega Light Phaser. In December 1988, he said that, to switch between light gun and joystick games, active XEGS gamers are frustrated by the need to continually re-plug their devices and power cycle the system, due to the system's lack of autodetection, which is complicated by its awkwardly downward slanting ports. He said "Barnyard Blaster and Bug Hunt could have been just a bit smarter" by including the simple routine that the magazine was forced to write and publish as a workaround.

In the August 1989 issue of A.N.A.L.O.G. Computing magazine, Matthew Ratcliff wrote a front page feature on programming the XG-1 in users' custom software, including his program allowing the light gun to be used to make menu selections. He gave the XG-1 a positive review, calling it an "exciting alternative to joysticks". He said it "has much more 'noise' in the horizontal direction than vertical" due to hardware limitations.

The 2014 book Vintage Game Consoles also criticized its accuracy compared to Nintendo and Sega, but says it became collectible as Atari's only light gun.

See also
 Atari 8-bit computer peripherals

References

External links
Atari XEGS Information by Antic contributing editor Matthew Ratcliff
The Atari 8-Bit FAQ

Atari 8-bit family
Light guns